John Steel may refer to :
John Steel (Canadian politician) (1737–1826), politician in Lower Canada
John Steel (drummer) (born 1941),  original drummer of the band, The Animals
John Steel (footballer, born 1895) (1895–1953), Scottish footballer (Queen's Park, Nelson)
John Steel (footballer, born 1902), Scottish footballer (Hamilton Academical, Burnley)
John Steel (MP) (1786–1868), British MP for Cockermouth (1854–1857)
John Steel (singer) (1895–1971), American tenor
John Steel (swimmer) (born 1972), New Zealand Olympic swimmer
John Miles Steel (1877–1965), first Commander-in-Chief of the RAF's Bomber Command
John R. Steel (born 1948), American mathematician at University of California, Berkeley
Leslie White, who wrote as "John Steel" for newspaper of Socialist Labor Party of America

See also
Jon Steel (born 1980), Scottish rugby league player
Sir John Steell or Steel (1804–1891), Scottish sculptor
John Steele (disambiguation)
The John Steel Singers